Cheraghabad-e Bala (also Romanized as Cherāghābād-e Bālā) is a village in Cheraghabad Rural District, Tukahur District, Minab County, Hormozgan Province, Iran. At the 2006 census, its population was 782, in 162 families.

References 

Populated places in Minab County